Saint John is one of the parishes of Grenada. Its capital is Gouyave. Fishing is the main industry. Gouyave is also home to Grenada's biggest nutmeg factory and also the Dougladston Estate, an old spice plantation. There is almost no tourism in this parish of Grenada, with only a few small guesthouses such as the Mango Bay Cottages in Woodford.

History
In 1889, an iron bridge was built on a new boulder bank between Gouyave and the neighbourhood of Florida. On November 8, 1897, there were heavy rains in the parish, which nearly flooded the Gouyave River. On December 6, 1897, the Gouyave-Florida boulder bank and stone bridge were destroyed. Gouyave was also known as Charlotte town.

Constituency

Parishes of Grenada